Ejnar Carl "Hund-Eje" Olsson (July 9, 1896 – January 24, 1925) was a Swedish ice hockey player, who competed in the 1924 Winter Olympics.

In 1924, he was a member of the Swedish ice hockey team, which finished fourth in the Olympic ice hockey tournament. He played four matches as goaltender.

In those days, Swedish hockey was still being played on lakes. The 1925 winter was unusually mild, and "Hund-Eje" became its most notable casualty when he drowned in Lake Norrviken while ice skating.

References

External links

1896 births
1925 deaths
Ice hockey players at the 1924 Winter Olympics
Olympic ice hockey players of Sweden
Swedish ice hockey goaltenders
Deaths by drowning